NAM Atlântico (A140) (previously PHM Atlântico (A140)) is a landing ship and current flagship of the Brazilian Navy.

History

In 2017, media outlets began reporting that Brazil was interested in purchasing Ocean as a replacement for the aircraft carrier São Paulo, which was withdrawn from service in 2017 following multiple mechanical failures. The Royal Navy released an asking price of £80.3 million ($105.8 million USD), which the Brazilian Navy called "convenient". In November 2017, the Brazilian Ministry of Defense began formal negotiations for the acquisition of the ship.

In December 2017, the Brazilian Navy confirmed the purchase of the ship for £84.6 million, equivalent to R$359.5M and USD $113.2M. Following her decommissioning from Royal Navy service in March 2018, she would undertake a period of maintenance in the United Kingdom and was expected to arrive in Rio de Janeiro by 25 August 2018, with the intention of being commissioned and fully operational by 2020. Brazilian defence officials confirmed the purchase, as well as officials from the UK MoD, as of 17 February 2018.

The Brazilian Navy commissioned the multi-purpose helicopter carrier Atlântico (A140) on 29 June in the United Kingdom. The helicopter carrier package for Brazil includes an Artisan 3D search radar, KH1007 surface surveillance radar system, four 30 mm DS30M Mk 2 remote weapon systems and four Mk 5B landing craft. However, the three original 20 mm Mk 15 Block 1B Phalanx close-in weapon systems, the torpedo defence systems and 7.62 mm M134 machine guns were removed from the ship before the transfer to Brazil. The ship displaces 21,578 tonnes, is 203.43 m long and has a range of 8,000 n miles. The ship underwent maintenance work by Babcock and BAE Systems in February.

The ship was scheduled to reach her homeport, Arsenal de Marinha do Rio de Janeiro (AMRJ), on 25 August, where Atlântico underwent operational sea training under the Royal Navy's Flag Officer Sea Training.

On 12 November 2020, Atlântico was redesignated "NAM", for "multipurpose aircraft carrier", from "PHM", for "multipurpose helicopter carrier", to reflect her capability to operate with fixed-wing medium-altitude long-endurance unmanned aerial vehicles as well as crewed tiltrotor VTOL aircraft.

In 23 February 2023, the vessel was sent to the port of São Sebastião to provide a field hospital for rescue efforts during the 2023 São Paulo floods and landslides. On board, the vessel carried 28 medics of several specialties including surgeons, dentists and orthopedists and 180 marines who were designated to operate heavy machinery in aid of the search and rescue efforts.

Gallery

See also
 List of ships of the Brazilian Navy

References

External links

 HMS Ocean (naval-technology.com)

Helicopter carrier classes
Ships built in Govan
1995 ships
Aircraft carriers of the Brazilian Navy
Amphibious warfare vessels of the Brazilian Navy